Warichi or wari-chi, literally "dividing the land", is the process of land redistribution practices of arable land and communal management that become common during the early modern era (seventeenth to nineteenth-century) in Japan. It was often used as means of spread the impact of flooding in villages that suffered from flood hazards. The practice continued into at least the 1980s by tenant unions. It is an expression of and an important influence upon the make up of Japanese society. 

Villages which practiced warichi periodically reassigned lands to local farmers. The process used unbiased and random techniques, including lottery groups (kuji kumi), to ensure that all families would receive a similar proportion of good and marginal lands. Families were then allowed to dispose of their rights as they saw fit, e.g. buy, sell, rent, bequeath or inherit. The cultivation rights were equivalent to stock shares in a village agricultural corporation. Preparatory surveys for this redistribution could take months.

Some land was excluded from the process, and might be given to village or district officials, or allowed to lie fallow. In the Tokugawa period, other land of minimal use, such as a mountain or an island, was saved for individuals facing unforeseeable circumstances and in this way, the system worked as an insurance policy for villagers.

Landed was not distributed on a per capita basis but had alternative social functions such as, e.g. controlling risk, providing incentives to encourage participating in other village projects, reducing social conflict, maximizing tax payment. The system was seen to have worked most effectively where they were locally implemented rather than when local government administrators attempted to force them. 

The system declined due to new laws in modern Japan encouraging the privatization of arable land.

Bibliography 
 Smitka, Michael. Agricultural Growth and Japanese Economic Development, Taylor & Francis, 1998.

References 

Land use
Society of Japan
Environment of Japan